A dry ice bomb is a simple explosive device. While their simplicity, ease of construction, high bursting pressure and loud noise make them appealing for recreational purposes, they can be unpredictable and dangerous. These bombs have led to many injuries and are illegal in many jurisdictions.

Overview 
Dry ice bombs are commonly made from a container such as a plastic bottle, water and dry ice. The bottle is partly filled with water. Chunks of dry ice are added and the container is closed tightly. As the solid carbon dioxide warms, it sublimates to gas and the pressure in the bottle increases. Bombs typically rupture within 30 seconds to half an hour, dependent largely on the temperature of the air outside the bottle. A dry ice bomb may develop frost on its exterior prior to explosion. After explosion, it appears to have shattered, with the overall shape of the device intact.

Dangers 
Dry ice bombs may induce serious risks:
 Explosion can occur within seconds, injuring the handler.
 The shockwave can be extremely loud, causing hearing damage even at substantial distances.
 The blast can propel fragments of the container at very high speeds, causing cuts and puncture wounds.

Injuries are common, with glass bottles in particular posing risks of serious injury or death.
In one case, the explosive release of carbon dioxide gas ruptured the esophagus of a child, requiring emergency surgery.

Bombs that fail to explode pose a major safety problem: They cannot be left, yet cannot be safely approached.

Legality 

Dry ice bombs are illegal in many jurisdictions. Manufacturing one or using one can lead to imprisonment.
 A law in California that defines "destructive device" includes a list of "weapons" including "[any] sealed device containing dry ice (CO2) or other chemically reactive substances assembled for the purpose of causing an explosion by a chemical reaction". 
 In Nebraska and other States the noise generated may violate local laws. 
 Arizona prohibits dry ice bombs if there is an intent to cause injury, death, or damage to the property of another, as well as their possession by "prohibited possessors" such as convicted felons and illegal immigrants.
 In Utah, simple possession of a dry ice bomb or similar pressurized chemical reaction bomb is a second-degree felony.
 In Colorado, the creation of a dry ice bomb is considered illegal due to interpretation as "possession of an explosive device" 
 Leaving an unexploded dry ice bomb can be construed as public endangerment.
 Exploding a dry ice bomb in public in Pennsylvania can result in criminal charges if it is not done on a bomb range, gun range or open area.

See also 
 Spud gun
 Diet Coke and Mentos eruption
 Chlorine bomb
 Rapid phase transition
 Liquid nitrogen cocktail

References

External links 
 DryIceNetwork.com – Dry ice information source
 USENET pyrotechnics FAQ
 Mad Physics :: Dry Ice Explosions

Applications of carbon dioxide
Improvised explosive devices